Brachial means "pertaining to the arm", and may refer to:

 Brachial artery, in anatomy
 Brachial fascia
 Brachial lymph nodes
 Brachial veins
 Brachial plexus, a network of nerves
 Brachial valve, the upper valve in Brachiopods
 Brachialis muscle